Rudolf Fitzner ( May 4, 1868 – February 2, 1934) was an Austrian violinist and music teacher.

He was born in Ernstbrunn in 1868. He studied at the Vienna Conservatory. Among his teachers were Anton Bruckner and Jakob Moritz Grün (violin).

In 1894 he established the Fitzner Quartet.

He briefly was chamber musician of the King of Bulgaria starting in 1911, but he soon returned to Austria. He died in Maxglan (present day in Salzburg).

References
 Biography under external links

External links
 Biography in German

1868 births
1934 deaths
Austrian classical violinists
Male classical violinists
University of Music and Performing Arts Vienna alumni